António Fernandes (born 18 October 1962) is a chess player from Pampilhosa da Serra, Portugal.  Fernandes became an International Master (IM) in 1985 and earned the Grandmaster (GM) title in 2003.

References

External links

1962 births
Living people
People from Pampilhosa da Serra
Portuguese chess players
Chess grandmasters